Faye Grant (born Faye Elizabeth Yoe, July 16, 1957) is an American film, television and stage actress and singer.  She is best known for her role as Julie Parrish in NBC's science fiction series V between 1983 and 1985.

Early life
Grant was born in St. Clair Shores, Michigan. Her father was a police officer in her home town. She is a 1975 graduate of Lake Shore High School. She took her acting name from the street where she grew up.

Career
Her first television role was on the TV series The Greatest American Hero, in which she appeared as Rhonda Blake, one of the students of main character Ralph Hinkley (William Katt). Her best-known role came in 1983 as Juliet Parrish in the science fiction mini-series V, the 1984 sequel V: The Final Battle and V: The Series from 1984 to 1985. Her film credits include The January Man (1989), Internal Affairs (1990), Drive Me Crazy (1999), Omen IV: The Awakening (1991) and Public Affairs (2017).

She has also appeared on shows starring Stephen Collins: the TV series version of Tales of the Gold Monkey, and 7th Heaven. She guest-starred  as Abigail "Abby" Morris in the 7th Heaven episode "What Will People Say?" which first aired on November 11, 1996. They also co-starred in Drive Me Crazy (1999).

Grant starred on Broadway as vocally challenged Lina Lamont in the 1985 stage adaptation of Singin' in the Rain, which won her the Theatre World Award and a Drama Desk Award nomination as Outstanding Featured Actress in a Musical. In director Jerry Zaks' 1986 Lincoln Center-to-Broadway revival of John Guare's The House of Blue Leaves, Grant played the deaf Corinna Stroller, following Julie Hagerty and Patricia Clarkson in the role.

Grant has made guest appearances in TV shows like The Incredible Hulk, the Voyagers! pilot episode as Mary Murphy, Hardcastle and McCormick, Time of Your Life and Tales From the Crypt. She appeared on the show State of Grace from 2001 to 2002 as Tattie McKee.

Personal life

Grant married actor Stephen Collins in April 1985 in New York City. They have a daughter, Kate (born in 1989). Grant met Collins during production of Tales of the Gold Monkey in the early 1980s.

She recorded a confidential marriage counseling session in 2012 without the knowledge of Collins or the therapist, in which Collins confessed sexual misconduct with minors. A police investigation took place and the recording of the session was leaked. After the recording became public Collins admitted to the acts and publicly apologized. Their divorce was finalized in January 2015.

Filmography

References

External links

1957 births
Actresses from Michigan
American film actresses
American musical theatre actresses
American television actresses
Living people
People from St. Clair Shores, Michigan
20th-century American actresses
21st-century American actresses